Hà Giang (chữ nôm: 河楊) is a province in the Northeast region of Vietnam. It is located in the far north of the country, and contains Vietnam's northernmost point. It shares a 270 km long border with Yunnan province of southern China, and thus is known as Vietnam's final frontier.

The provincial capital, also called Hà Giang, is connected by Highway 2 and is 320 km away from Hanoi. The border crossing is at Thanh Thủy, 25 km from the provincial capital. It is one of the poorest provinces of Vietnam as it has mountainous topography with the least potential for agricultural development.

In addition to Thanh Thủy, there are three smaller gates, namely the Phó Bảng, Xín Mần and Săm Pun.

Geography
Hà Giang is bordered by Cao Bằng, Tuyên Quang, Lào Cai, and Yên Bái provinces and has a common international border with China in the north. Hà Giang has many high rocky mountains, limestone formations and springs; the important mountains are the Cam and Mỏ Neo. The major rivers of the region are the Lô River (Hà Giang city is located on its left bank) and Miện River.

The topography of the province of Hà Giang is fairly complex: "temperate, but highly localized montane weather patterns create variable conditions among different regions". It has impressive limestone and granite peaks and outcrops. It has three regions. Climatically, it has two seasons, dry and monsoon, dependent on the altitude of the region. The two northern Indochinese climatic zones on the border influence the climate in the northern part of the province. The lower areas in the province comprise low hills, the Lô River Valley and Hà Giang city. In Cao Bồ district, the dry season lasts from mid-September until the end of May, and the monsoon season lasts from the beginning of June until mid-September. However, in Du Già district the wet season sets in one month earlier. The average annual humidity level is 84%.

Hà Giang has many mountains, including the two highest peaks, namely the Tây Côn Lĩnh and the Kiều Liêu Ti, and also has forests that provide lumber. It has about 1,000 species of herbal plants. The fauna includes tigers, peafowl, pheasants, and pangolin. Hà Giang city was heavily damaged during the 1979 war with China but has since been rebuilt.

Vegetation
Cultivated fields and livestock are generally found in elevations below . The forest has dense undergrowth with large vines, tree ferns and  rhododendrons. Banana, bamboo and secondary scrub grow on both sides of foot tracks in the forests. The forest also has an abundance of cascading streams, seepage streams from limestone formations, waterfalls, glides, and pools. The stiff limestone vertical rock face is seen above  on the northeast face of Mount Muong Cha, while its southwest slope exhibits a much gentler gradient, and is converted into agricultural fields. Above , there is a montane mixed semideciduous and evergreen cloud forest. This forest has an understory of Ericaceae with shrubs and epiphytic species of rhododendron and vaccinium. Species of Lauraceae, with Ericaceae and Oleaceae (at higher elevations with taxa in the Fagaceae, Primulaceae (formerly Myrsinaceae) and Araliaceae) are also recorded. Most of the tree trunks are covered with bryophyte mosses in this zone.

Fauna

16 reptile species (14 genera, five families) and 36 amphibian species (20 genera, seven families) have been recorded in the province.

Small mammals found on Tây Côn Lĩnh II include Cynopterus sphinx, Rousettus leschenaulti, Sphaerias blanfordi, Scaptonyx fusicaudus, Chodsigoa parca, Chodsigoa caovansunga, Blarinella griselda, Crocidura attenuata, Crocidura fuliginosa, Crocidura wuchihensis, Belomys pearsonii, Callosciurus inornatus, Leopoldamys edwardsi, Niviventer fulvescens, Niviventer langbianis, Niviventer tenaster, Chiropodomys gliroides, Ratufa bicolor, and Tamiops sp.

History
Archaeological excavations carried out near Hà Giang city at Đồi Thông (Pine Hill) have established the region's antiquity to about 30,000 years ago. During the Bronze Age Tày Yu tribes with culturally rich traditions ruled over the region; archaeological findings in the form of bronze drums of that age used for ceremonial purposes are used even to the present day by the Lô Lô and Pu Péo tribes of the region (Mèo Vạc, Hà Giang province).

What was later called Hà Giang province by the French was part of bộ Tân Hưng in ancient times, one of 15 bộ in the nation of Văn Lang. During the Ming dynasty occupation of Vietnam, at the start of the 15th century, it was known as the district of Bình Nguyên, before being later renamed to châu Vị Xuyên.

The French occupied this region in 1886, establishing their military garrison on the east bank of the Lô River and which later became one of the four major military establishments in French Indochina in North Vietnam in 1905. The Vietnamese Dao tribes rebelled against French colonial rule, first in 1901 led by Triệu Tiến Kiến and Triệu Tài Lộc, which was quelled, with the former being killed in the war. However, in 1913, Triệu Tài Lộc organized another rebellion with the help of Triệu Tiến Tiến, another member of his clan, which lasted for two years until 1915. Their slogan was "No Corvees, no taxes for the French; drive out the French to recover our country; liberty for the Dao." This revolt was known as the White Hat Revolt since the Vietnamese carried a white flag engraved with "four ideograms to Quốc Bách Kỹ" (meaning "White Flag of the Fatherland"). The rebellion spread to Tuấn Quang, Lào Cai and Yên Bái. In 1915 the French ruthlessly suppressed the rebellion, deporting many Vietnamese and hanging at least 67 "rebels".

Before 1975, Hà Giang comprised the districts of Đồng Văn, Vị Xuyên, Xín Mần, Yên Minh, Hoàng Su Phì, Bắc Quang, Thanh Thủy, and Quản Bạ.

The province's name derives from the Sino-Vietnamese 河楊.

H'Mông Lords of Sà Phìn

The history of the H'Mông Lords of the northern region of the province bordering China (Đồng Văn and Mèo Vạc) is also integral to the province as the H'Mông people have dominated the region from the late 18th century. The Vương family of the Huang clan established their rule at Đồng Văn and Mèo Vạc, which was endorsed by the Nguyễn Kings.

During French colonial rule, the French further supported the Lord to keep their hold on the border territory. Vương Chính Đức was recognized as the king of the H'Mông people in 1900. A palace befitting the king was built between 1902 and 1903, at Sà Phìn (16 km west of Đồng Văn town) by inducting Chinese architects. The Lord's loyalty to the French was evident in the support that the French got from him during their campaign to put down a rebellion launched by the local tribes. In recognition, the Lord was given the rank of a General of the French Army (a fully uniformed Lord's picture is seen in the interior rooms of the palace).

The increasing opposition by the Vietnamese to French rule saw the Lord adopting a neutral stance. Vương Chú Sển who succeeded his father after the latter's death in 1944, however, pledged support to Hồ Chí Minh. The historical palace of the Vương Lord was built in the traditional style of Northeast Asian royal palaces. The palace built on the "Geomantic principles" has four double-storied wings planned in 19th-century southern Chinese town house style with "mui luyện" ("yin-yang") tiles. The two wings are linked by three open courtyards. A moat surrounds the palace. Tombs of the royal family members, which are intricately carved in wood, are located outside the palace walls. Only the walls of the buildings are made of bricks, while the other components of the buildings are made of wood.

Administrative divisions
Hà Giang is subdivided into 11 district-level sub-divisions:

 10 districts:
 Bắc Mê
 Bắc Quang
 Đồng Văn
 Hoàng Su Phì
 Mèo Vạc
 Quản Bạ
 Quang Bình
 Vị Xuyên
 Xín Mần
 Yên Minh

 1 provincial city:
 Hà Giang (capital)

They are further subdivided into 9 commune-level towns (or townlets), 181 communes, and 5 wards.

Table of local government divisions

Demographics
It is one of the least populated provinces in the northern midlands and mountain areas of Vietnam. The male population during this period was 431,771 while the female population was 422,908. The rural population was 719,108 against an urban population of 135,571 (about 19% of the rural population).

There are 43 ethnic groups in Hà Giang recognized by the Vietnamese government. Each ethnicity has their own language, traditions, and subculture. The largest ethnic groups are: Mông (34.25%), Tày (22.55%), Dao (14.88%), Vietnamese (12.32%), Nùng (9.53%), Giáy (2.03%), La Chí (1.62%). Others accounted for the remaining 2.82%.

Languages spoken in Hà Giang province include the following.

Hmong-Mien languages
Hmong
Iu Mien
Kim Mun
Pa-Hng (Bắc Quang, Quang Bình)
Tai languages
Nùng
Tày
Giáy (Yên Minh, Đồng Văn)
Buyei (Quan Ba)
Kra languages
Red Gelao (Yên Minh)
White Gelao (Đồng Văn)

Green  Gelao (Đồng Văn

Qabiao (Pupeo) (Đồng Văn)
Lachi (Hoàng Su Phì, Xín Mần, Bắc Quang)
Tibeto-Burman languages
Red Lolo (Mèo Vạc, Yên Minh)
Flowery Lolo (Mèo Vạc, Đồng Văn)
Yi (Lolo) (Mèo Vạc, Đồng Văn)

Economy

Hà Giang is a highly mountainous region, and travel around the province can be difficult. Much of the province is too mountainous for agriculture, leaving much of the land covered by forests. Hà Giang's central plateau is good for growing plums, peaches, and persimmons, which the province exports. Tea is also grown there. The farming economy is also getting a boost with growing orange and mandarin trees as it sustains many households with an income in the range of VND 150 to 200 million a year.

Hà Giang is one of the poorest provinces of Vietnam. Traditionally, the vast majority of its economic activity revolved around agriculture and forestry. However, in recent years, there have been attempts to establish a manufacturing industry. Infrastructure in Hà Giang has seen improvement, but remains poor and roads, schools, and health services are underdeveloped compared to many other parts of Vietnam.

Hà Giang province has particularly assisted locals in developing their tea industry with financial (soft loans) and technical support in operations (sowing, tending, gathering and processing). This resulted in an increase in the yield from 9,625 tonnes (1995) to 20,394 tonnes (2002). Particular tea plantations of quality tea are the Shan Tuyết strain in Cao Bồ (Vị Xuyên District), Lũng Phìn (Đồng Văn District) and in Ngam La (Yên Minh District). Hà Giang tea is also popular in foreign markets.

The province is rich in minerals; 149 mines with 28 categories of minerals are spread in all districts of the province. Mineral deposits mined in the province are: antimony, iron ore, manganese, ferrite, zinc, tin, copper, bauxite, gold, gemstones, kaolin and mineral water. These are contributing to industrial development in the province. Plans have been put in place, with appropriate policies, to attract direct foreign investments in the province; China, South Korea, Thailand and other countries have already chipped in with investments in the mining and processing industries. The Asian Development Bank provided loans of US$3,000,000 to promote the tea industry in the province.

As Hà Giang is a mountainous region, the population is not large, and the majority of inhabitants are ethnic Vietnamese. The remainder are H'Mông, Tày, Dao, Mán, Nùng, Giấy, Lô Lô and Thổ; the majority engage in ancestor and spirit worship.

Of the national figure of 7,592 agriculture, forestry and fishery cooperatives, there are only 32 cooperatives in the province, of which 22 are agricultural and eight are fisheries. There are only 169 known farms in the province against the national number of 120,699.

The output value of agriculture produce at constant 1994 prices in the province was 838.4 billion dongs against the national value of 156,681.9 billion dongs. The province produced 280,300 tonnes of cereals against the national production of 43.58 million tonnes.

The per capita production of cereals in the district was 397.5 kg against the national figure of 501.8 kg in 2007. In 2007, the industrial output of the province was 526.1 billion dongs against the national output of 1,469,272.3 billion dongs. There is a recently established cement plant with a 300,000 tonne annual capacity.

Attractions

Quản Bạ Valley
Uniformly shaped hills of the valley are viewed from this summit. Quản Bạ Pass provides views of Thach Nui Doi (literal meaning: double stalagmite, but also known as "Two Stone Breasts" in the valley below). It is known for its secret grottoes and caves, colourful orchids, plum and peach trees, persimmon orchards, medicinal plants and many more. The town of Đồng Văn is famous for its Phó Bảng Street which features multistoried buildings built with clay bricks and tiled roofs. The weekly market is where the Tày and H'Mông ethnic groups of the province visit in large numbers to trade in various types of goods and colourful hand woven cloth.

Phương Thiện Cave
It is the location of many sights, especially natural caves and grottos of Doi, Lang Lô and Phương Thiện. The surrounding area is also known for its plums, pears, oranges, apples and Tuyết Sơn tea above . It is set about  into the face of the hill. According to folklore, heavenly female beings came there to bathe in the lunar new year, thus its name. The local populace uses it as a water source and to pray for good luck in the new year.

Đồng Văn
The highland region is famous for fruits such as Hau plums, peaches and persimmons without seeds. It has plants such as ginseng, cinnamon and anise.

Mã Pí Lèng
The ethnic clans of White H'Mông, Tày, and Lô Lô congregate here, particularly the young, in search of life partners or to exchange partners. The Lô Lô people who dominate the local village by the same name in particular come here in their colourful regale.

Chợ tình Khâu Vai
The Chợ tình Khâu Vai market only meets once a year, on the 27th day of the third lunar month at Khâu Vai commune in Mèo Vạc district, based on an old folk tale. A long time ago, there was a young beautiful couple who were in love but they were in different districts, which would have meant that she would have moved to her husband's area. Her home district opposed this, while the boy's district wanted this, causing political tension. When the couple was meeting, the two groups descended into warfare. To avoid bloodshed for their societies, the couple decided to break up and only secretly meet once a year on the anniversary, at Khâu Vai. Since then the area has become a dating spot for couples. In the last 10 years, economic pressures have led to a market being set up to capitalise on the anniversary celebrations.

Đồi Thông
Đồi Thông (Pine Hill) settlement is an ancient settlement dating back 30,000 years, belonging to the Sơn Vi period as established by archaeological excavations. The excavations had unearthed antiquity axe heads and primitive tools which are displayed in the local museum at Hà Giang and the History Museum in Hanoi.

Hà Giang museum
Hà Giang museum, located in the centre of Hà Giang city, not only has an array of findings from archaeological excavations but also houses historical artefacts, a bronze drum collection and also costumes of the local ethnic clans. The museum building is in the form of a big lotus opening up its petals, in a red and white colour mansion.

Hà Giang market
Hà Giang market is an important market centre in Hà Giang city on the east bank of the Lô River. Tày, Nùng, Red Dao and White H'Mông ethnic groups congregate every Sunday at the market.

Lang Si
Lang Si is a village at the Lang Si pass where the White H'Mông tribes assemble at the market held once every six days. It is a honey-producing area and has many apiaries.

Sà Phìn
Sà Phìn is a small town in the remote Sà Phìn valley ( from the Chinese border) where H'Mông Lords ruled. The unique feature is of the large double-storied houses which are built in Chinese style made out of yellow bricks with Chinese style roofs. The twin white towered palace building is distinct among the 20 odd buildings.

Khu nhà Dòng họ Vương
The Vương family mansion is an architectural heritage landmark in Sà Phìn commune, Đồng Văn district that was listed by the government in 1993. At the start of the 20th century, Vương Chính Đức, a member of the H'Mông people, was appointed the Bang Tá and he had the family residence expanded into a mansion from where he worked. It is of a style that is rare in this mountainous region of northern Vietnam. The building was designed in the style of the later period of the Qing dynasty of China, and is grouped into three sections, the front, middle and rear.

Festivals

Hà Giang has many cultural festivals due to the presence of more than 20 ethnic minority groups. Many of these groups are noted for their artistic abilities, especially their weaving and hand-made textile products. The Spring Festival is celebrated by the H'Mông and Dao people, usually shortly after the Lunar New Year and lasts between three and seven days. The people celebrate with singing and feasting and drinking alcohol.

References

External links
Hà Giang municipal government website

 
Northeast (Vietnam)
Provinces of Vietnam